is a direct broadcast satellite (DBS) service that provides satellite television, audio programming and interactive television services to households in Japan, owned by parent company SKY Perfect JSAT Corporation.

SKY PerfecTV! is also a direct broadcast satellite (DBS) service. While SKY PerfecTV! Premium Service use DVB-S and DVB-S2, SKY PerfecTV! Basic Service use ISDB-S.

See also

References

External links
  

Direct broadcast satellite services
Television networks in Japan
Television channels and stations established in 1994
Entertainment companies of Japan